Mukim Bangar is a mukim in Temburong District, Brunei. The mukim encompasses Bangar, the district's sole town and administrative centre.

Name 
The mukim is named after the town Bangar, which is also the predominant settlement it encompasses.

Geography 
The mukim is located in the north-west of the Temburong District, bordering Mukim Labu to the north, Mukim Batu Apoi to the east, Mukim Amo to the south-east, Mukim Bokok to the south-west and Limbang District in the Malaysian state of Sarawak to the west and north. Mukim Bangar has one island within its vicinity which is Pulau Kibi.

Demographics 
As of 2016 census, the population was 2,449 with  males and  females. The mukim had 535 households occupying 515 dwellings. Among the population,  lived in urban areas, while the remainder of  lived in rural areas.

Villages 
As of 2016, the mukim comprised the following census villages:

Border crossings

There is a road border crossing into Malaysia's Sarawak state at Kampung Ujung Jalan, 5km from Bangar town. Previously the crossing had to be done by vehicular ferry across the Pandaruan River which forms the Brunei-Malaysia border. However, a Malaysia-Brunei Friendship Bridge has been constructed and opened to vehicular traffic on 8 December 2013.

Both Brunei and Malaysia have constructed new customs, immigration and quarantine checkpoints at the location of the crossing. The Brunei checkpoint is called the Ujung Jalan Immigration Checkpoint. Before the construction of the bridge, the Brunei customs, immigration and quarantine checkpoint was housed in a wooden building in Kampung Puni, 500m from the ferry landing towards Bangar, while Malaysian customs and immigration procedures had to be carried out at Limbang wharf in Limbang, 15km away as there was no checkpoint at Pandaruan.

Notes

References 

Bangar
Temburong District
Brunei–Malaysia border crossings